Barre Phillips (born October 27, 1934, in San Francisco, California, United States) is an American jazz bassist. A professional musician since 1960, he moved to New York City in 1962, then to Europe in 1967. Since 1972, he has been based in southern France where, in 2014, he founded the European Improvisation Center.

He studied briefly in 1959 with S. Charles Siani, Assistant Principal Bassist with the San Francisco Symphony. During the 1960s, he recorded with (among others) Eric Dolphy, Jimmy Giuffre, Archie Shepp, Peter Nero, Attila Zoller, Lee Konitz and Marion Brown.

Phillips' 1968 recording of solo bass improvisations, issued as Journal Violone in the US, Unaccompanied Barre in England, and Basse Barre in France on Futura Records, is generally credited as the first solo bass record.  A 1971 record with Dave Holland, Music from Two Basses, was probably the first record of improvised double bass duets.

In the 1970s, he was a member of the well-regarded and influential group The Trio, with saxophonist John Surman and drummer Stu Martin.  In the 1980s and 1990s, he played regularly with the London Jazz Composers Orchestra, led by fellow bassist Barry Guy.  He worked on soundtracks of the motion pictures Merry-Go-Round (1981), Naked Lunch (1991, together with Ornette Coleman) and Alles was baumelt, bringt Glück! (2013).

He has also worked with (among many others) bassists Peter Kowald and Joëlle Léandre, guitarist Derek Bailey, clarinetists Theo Jörgensmann, Vinny Golia, and Aurélien Besnard, saxophonists Peter Brötzmann, Evan Parker and Joe Maneri, and pianist Paul Bley.

Barre is the father of the rock guitarist, Jay Crawford from the band Bomb; of the bassist Dave Phillips; and of singer Claudia Phillips, who was a one-hit wonder in France in 1987 with "Quel souci La Boétie".

Discography

As leader
 Basse Barre (Futura, 1969)
 Alors (Futura, 1970)
 Music from Two Basses (ECM, 1971)
 For All It Is (JAPO, 1973) (recorded in 1971)
 Mountainscapes (ECM, 1976)
 Three Day Moon (ECM, 1978)
 Die Jungen: Random Generators (FMP, 1979)
 Journal Violone II (ECM, 1979)
 Music by... (ECM, 1980)
 Call Me When You Get There, (ECM, 1984)
 Camouflage (Victo, 1989)
 Naxos (CELP, 1990)
 Aquarian Rain (ECM, 1991)
 Etchings in the Air (PSF, 1996)
 No Pieces (Emouvance, 1996)
 Uzu (PSF, 1997)
 Jazzd'aià, (Bleu Regard, 1998)
 Play 'em as They Fall (Eyewill, 1999)
 Trignition (Nine Winds, 1999)
 Journal Violone 9 (Emouvance, 2001)
 October Base Trilouge (3D, 2001)
 After You've Gone (Victo, 2004)
 Angles of Repose (ECM, 2004)
 LDP (PSI, 2005)
 The Iron Stone (ECM, 2006)
 L' Improviste (CD Baby, 2008)
 While You Were Out (CD Baby/Kadima Collective, 2009)
 Everybody Else But Me (Foghorn, 2011)
 End to End (ECM, 2018)

As sideman
 Attila Zoller Quartet: The Horizon Beyond (1965)
 Archie Shepp Quartet: New Thing at Newport (1965)
 Bob James Trio: Explosions (1965)
 Gong: Magick Brother (1969)
 Chris McGregor Septet: Up to Earth,  (Fledg'ling, 1969; 2008)
 Chris McGregor Trio: Our Prayer (Fledg'ling, 1969; 2008)
 The Trio featuring John Surman: The Dawn Sessions (1970)
 Terje Rypdal: What Comes After (ECM, 1973)
 Alfred Harth: This Earth! (ECM, 1983) with Paul Bley, Trilok Gurtu & Maggie Nicols
 Barry Guy and the London Jazz Composers' Orchestra: Zurich Concerts (Intakt, 1988)
 Barry Guy and the London Jazz Composers' Orchestra: Harmos (Intakt, 1989)
 Barry Guy and the London Jazz Composers' Orchestra: Double Trouble (Intakt, 1990)
 Barry Guy and the London Jazz Composers' Orchestra with Irène Schweizer: Theoria (Intakt, 1992)
 Time Will Tell with Paul Bley and Evan Parker (ECM, 1994)
 Joe Maneri: Tales of Rohnlief (ECM, 1998)
 Barry Guy and the London Jazz Composers' Orchestra: Double Trouble Two (Intakt, 1998)
 Sankt Gerold with Paul Bley and Evan Parker (ECM, 2000)
 Musique Primale  with Philippe Festou, ensemble contemporain Yin (sornettes, 2009)
 Barry Guy and the London Jazz Composers' Orchestra with Irène Schweizer: Radio Rondo/Schaffhausen Concert (Intakt, 2009)
 The Rock on the Hill  with Lol Coxhill and JT Bates (nato, 2011)
 No Meat Inside (Facing You / IMR, 2013) quartet with François Cotinaud, Henri Roger, and Emmanuelle Somer

References

External links
Discography
FMP releases
ECM releases
CEPI

1934 births
Living people
American jazz double-bassists
Male double-bassists
Avant-garde jazz musicians
Free improvisation
ECM Records artists
Jazz musicians from San Francisco
21st-century double-bassists
21st-century American male musicians
American male jazz musicians
NoBusiness Records artists